The Saturn Award for Best Editing (originally Saturn Award for Outstanding Editing) is one of the annual awards given by the Academy of Science Fiction, Fantasy and Horror Films. The Saturn Awards, which are the oldest film-specialized awards to honor science fiction, fantasy, and horror in film (the Hugo Award for Best Dramatic Presentation is the oldest award for science fiction and fantasy films), included the category for the first time at the 5th Saturn Awards.

The award was discontinued after being awarded again at the following ceremony, but was reactivated for the 38th ceremony in 2012. Paul Hirsch, who won the inaugural award for Star Wars (1977), sharing the award with Marcia Lucas and Richard Chew, won it again thirty-four years later for Mission: Impossible – Ghost Protocol (2011); he is currently the only editor to have won it twice.

Winners and nominees

1970s

2010s

2020s

Multiple nominations
5 nominations
 Jeffrey Ford

4 nominations
 Christian Wagner

3 nominations
 Maryann Brandon
 Bob Ducsay
 John Gilroy
 Fred Raskin
 Matthew Schmidt

2 nominations
 Leigh Folsom Boyd
 Mark Day
 Stefan Grube
 Eddie Hamilton
 James Herbert
 Dylan Highsmith
 Michael Kahn
 Mary Jo Markey
 Kelly Matsumoto
 Nicholas Monsour
 Kirk Morri
 Tim Squyres

Multiple wins
2 wins
 Bob Ducsay
 Paul Hirsch

References

External links
 Official Site

Editing, Saturn Award for Best